Presser Home for Retired Music Teachers, also known as Mt. Airy Commons, is a historic retirement home located in the Mount Airy neighborhood of Philadelphia, Pennsylvania.  The Presser Home was built in 1914, and expanded in 1931. It is a three-story, "H"-shaped, buff Roman brick building in the Italian Renaissance Revival-style. It features limestone and terra cotta decorative elements.  The Presser Carriage House was built in 1898, and is a 2 1/2-story, gray brick, Tudor Revival-style carriage house.

It was added to the National Register of Historic Places in 2006.

The building adjoins the Nugent Home for Baptists, which was also listed on the National Register in 2006.  Nolen Properties owns both buildings. It has completed restoration of the Presser building, and was working on the restoration of the Nugent building in 2013.

References

Residential buildings on the National Register of Historic Places in Philadelphia
Renaissance Revival architecture in Pennsylvania
Tudor Revival architecture in Pennsylvania
Residential buildings completed in 1931
Mount Airy, Philadelphia